Claude Williams (born 1965) is an American former professional basketball player. He played college basketball for the North Carolina A&T Aggies before playing professionally in the Netherlands and France.

College career
Williams played five seasons of college basketball for the North Carolina A&T Aggies. After appearing in just five games in 1983–84, he was a consistent member of the Aggies from 1984–85 to 1987–88. In 122 career games, he averaged 13.5 points, 8.0 rebounds, 2.4 assists and 1.7 steals per game. He was named the MEAC Player of the Year and MEAC Tournament MVP as a senior in 1988.

In 2016, Williams was inducted into the North Carolina A&T Sports Hall of Fame. As of 2016, he was third all-time in scoring (1,648), second in rebounding (973), fifth in field goals made (604), fifth in steals (196), and second in free throw attempts (676).

Professional career
In 1989–90 and 1990–91, Williams played in the Netherlands for BS Weert. He led the Dutch Basketball League in steals both seasons and blocks in his second season.

For the 1991–92 season, Williams moved to France to play for Châlons-en-Champagne in the LNB Pro B. For the 1992–93 season, he joined Châlons-sur-Marne in the LNB Pro A. He returned to the Pro B to play for Nancy in 1993–94. Between 1994 and 1998, he played four seasons for Évreux, with the first season in the Pro B and the final three in the Pro A.

References

External links
French League profile
Sports-Reference.com profile

1965 births
Living people
ALM Évreux Basket players
American expatriate basketball people in France
American expatriate basketball people in the Netherlands
American men's basketball players
BSW (basketball club) players
Forwards (basketball)
North Carolina A&T Aggies men's basketball players
SLUC Nancy Basket players